Tridrepana maculosa is a moth in the family Drepanidae. It was described by Watson in 1957. It is found in the Chinese provinces of Sichuan and  Yunnan.

The wingspan is 38.8-46.4 mm for males and 45.6-48.2 mm for females.

References

Moths described in 1957
Drepaninae